Barrow Street was a twice-a-year American poetry magazine founded in 1998 and based in New York City. The small journal published prominent poets and its poems have been reprinted in anthologies such as The Best American Poetry series.

Some of the poets whose work appeared in the magazine include Kim Addonizio, Billy Collins, David Lehman, Richard Lehnert, Jeffrey Levine, Robert Wrigley and Rachel Zucker.

The editors also run Barrow Street Press, a small press with a book contest.

The last issue of Barrow Street was published in Winter 2018/2019.

References

External links
 Barrow Street Web site

Poetry magazines published in the United States
Biannual magazines published in the United States
Defunct literary magazines published in the United States
Magazines established in 1998
Magazines disestablished in 2018
Magazines published in New York City